Kriusha is a rural locality (a selo) and the administrative center of Kriushanskoye Rural Settlement, Paninsky District, Voronezh Oblast, Russia. The population was 725 as of 2010. There are 8 streets.

Geography 
Kriusha is located on the left bank of the Ikorets River, 29 km south of Panino (the district's administrative centre) by road. Agarkov is the nearest rural locality.

References 

Rural localities in Paninsky District